Vitaliy Volodymyrovych Kostyshyn (born 12 October 1986) is a former Ukrainian professional football midfielder who played for different Ukrainian clubs.

Managerial career
Since 2017 he is the manager of Podillya Khmelnytskyi.

Personal life
Vitaliy Kostyshyn is the brother of former footballer and current manager Ruslan Kostyshyn.

External links
 

1986 births
Living people
Sportspeople from Khmelnytskyi, Ukraine
Ukrainian footballers
Ukrainian football managers
FC CSKA Kyiv players
FC Kryvbas Kryvyi Rih players
FC Epitsentr Dunaivtsi players
FC Podillya Khmelnytskyi players
FC Podillya Khmelnytskyi managers
Ukrainian Premier League players
Ukrainian First League players
Ukrainian Second League players
Association football midfielders